Raymond Earl Moss (December 5, 1901 in Chattanooga, Tennessee – August 9, 1998) was a pitcher in Major League Baseball. He pitched from 1926 to 1931 with the Brooklyn Robins  and Boston Braves.

External links

1901 births
1998 deaths
Brooklyn Robins players
Boston Braves players
Baseball players from Tennessee
Major League Baseball pitchers
Laurel Lumberjacks players
Memphis Chickasaws players
New Orleans Pelicans (baseball) players
Jersey City Skeeters players
Los Angeles Angels (minor league) players
Rochester Red Wings players
Houston Buffaloes players
Birmingham Barons players
Chattanooga Lookouts players
Knoxville Smokies players
Nashville Vols players